Peter Fleming and John McEnroe were the defending champions, but lost in the semifinals to Swedes Stefan Edberg and Anders Järryd.

John Fitzgerald and Tomáš Šmíd won the title defeating Edberg and Järryd in the final.

Seeds

Draw

Finals

Top half

Section 1

Section 2

Bottom half

Section 3

Section 4

External links
 Main draw
1984 US Open – Men's draws and results at the International Tennis Federation

Men's doubles
US Open (tennis) by year – Men's doubles